Dele Ojo (10 July 1938 – 3 May 2018) was a Nigerian musician and performer. He is revered as one of the musicians to have spread and popularized the Jùjú genre of music.

Career
James Ogundele Ojo was born on 10 July 1938 in the village of Ilara-Mokin to Obasanya and his wife, who were first-generation Christian parents. His paternal grandmother was Osunre, and his great-grandparents were Awoolaye and Ifalouro, who were from Igbara-oke, were worshippers of the Ifa religion, and settled in Ilara-Mokin in the 1850s.

Education 
He attended St. Michael's Primary school from 1944 to 1955. As a fresh primary school student in 1952, Dele was taught how to use a typewriter through the sponsorship of his father. In 1954, he secured a job as a clerk but resigned after three months before he was given another job as a local school teacher.

Career 
Ojo's music career began when he met Victor Olaiya who employed him as a member of his music band. In 1969, Ojo formed a band called "Dele Ojo & His Star Brothers" after Olaiya had disbanded his group. Ojo and his group started recording and performing songs to massive reception in live shows in Ekiti State, Lagos and Osun State. They also toured several cities in the United States of America.

He died on 3 May 2018 at his hometown of Ilara Mokin in Ondo State at the age of 79.

Discography

Alafia
Juju Music at Its Best

References

Living people
20th-century Nigerian musicians
21st-century Nigerian musicians
People from Ekiti State
Nigerian male musicians
Yoruba musicians
Yoruba-language singers
20th-century male musicians
21st-century male musicians
1938 births